The canton of Anet is an administrative division of the Eure-et-Loir department, northern France. Its borders were modified at the French canton reorganisation which came into effect in March 2015. Its seat is in Anet.

It consists of the following communes:
 
Abondant
Anet
Berchères-sur-Vesgre
Boncourt
Boutigny-Prouais
Broué
Bû
La Chapelle-Forainvilliers
La Chaussée-d'Ivry
Cherisy
Germainville
Gilles
Goussainville
Guainville
Havelu
Marchezais
Le Mesnil-Simon
Montreuil
Oulins
Rouvres
Saint-Lubin-de-la-Haye
Saint-Ouen-Marchefroy
Saussay
Serville
Sorel-Moussel

References

Cantons of Eure-et-Loir